George Thomas Miller (born 25 November 1991) is an English professional footballer who plays for Swindon Supermarine as a midfielder.

Career
Born in Eccleston, Miller turned professional with Preston North End in January 2010, and made his senior début for Preston in May 2011 against Watford and won the game 3–1. In March 2012, Miller made his first start for Preston in a 3–0 loss to Colchester United. He came close to scoring his first senior goal for his club in this match, hitting the underside of the bar in the 15th minute of the game. In May 2012, Miller was released from the club after being told his contract would not be renewed.

Miller signed for League Two side Accrington Stanley on 19 June 2012.

He joined Chester on loan in December 2013 till 5 January 2014. His loan was then extended to 15 February 2014.

In September 2014, after impressing on trial, he signed for Gloucester City before signing on a dual registration basis for Southern League side Frome Town in January 2016.

In 2018 Swindon Supermarine announced on their website that Miller has signed for them from Frome.

Career statistics

References

1991 births
Living people
English footballers
Preston North End F.C. players
Accrington Stanley F.C. players
Chester F.C. players
English Football League players
Association football midfielders
Gloucester City A.F.C. players
Frome Town F.C. players
Swindon Supermarine F.C. players